Verly may refer to:

People
 Albert Jacques Verly, French military officer
 Michèle Verly (1909–1952), French stage and film actress

Places
 , France
 Grand-Verly, France
 Petit-Verly, France